Robert Buxton may refer to:

Robert Buxton (c. 1533 – 1607), English MP
Sir Robert Buxton, 1st Baronet (1753–1839), English politician 
Sir Robert Buxton, 3rd Baronet (1729–1888), English politician
Robert Hugh Buxton (1871–c. 1965), English artist
Robert Vere Buxton (1883–1953), English cricketer, soldier, banker

See also
Robert Bukton, English MP for Suffolk
Buxton (surname)